The Naalayira Divya Prabandham  is a collection of 4,000 Tamil verses composed by the 12 Alvars. It was compiled in its present form by Nathamuni during the 9th–10th centuries. The work, an important liturgical compilation of the Tamil Alvars, marks the beginning of the canonisation of 12 Vaishnava poet saints, and these hymns are still sung extensively today. The works were lost before they were collected and organised in the form of an anthology by Nathamuni.

Description 
The Divya Prabandham sings the praises of Narayana (Vishnu) and his many forms. The Alvars sang these songs at various sacred shrines known as the Divya Desams. The Tamil Vaishnavites are also known as Ubhaya Vedanti (those that follow both Vedas, that is, the Sanskrit Rigveda, Yajurveda, Samaveda, and Atharvaveda, as well as the Tamil-language Tiruvaymoli, a work which devotees of Sri Vaishnavism regard as the Tamil Veda. In many temples — Srirangam, for example — the chanting of the Divya Prabandham forms a major part of the daily service. It is also recited in some North Indian Vaishnavite temples, such as Badrinath. The Divya Prabandham is recited along with the Vedas, and it is given equal status to the Vedas in the Tenkalai denomination of Sri Vaishnavism, largely due to the efforts of Ramanuja who enshrined the Divya Prabandham on the same pedestal as the Vedas.

Prominent among its 4,000 verses are the over 1,100 verses known as the Tiruvaymoli ("verses of the sacred mouth"), composed by Nammalvar (Kaari Maaran, Sadagopan of Alvarthirunagari Temple) and which forms the third portion of the overall Divya Prabandham. Nammalvar self-identifies as a lovelorn gopi pining for Krishna.

The compendium begins with the Tirupallantu, a benedictory hymn written by Periyalvar, wishing long life to Vishnu.

Nomenclature

Pasuram 
The hymns or songs sung by the Alvars dedicated to Vishnu are specifically designated the term pasuram in Tamil.

Taniyan 
The works that make up the Naalayira Divya Prabandham are usually preceded by a taniyan. A taniyan refers to a stray verse, also referred to as a laudatory verse, that offers a brief synopsis of the life of the Alvar poet, a summary of the themes of the hymns, and emphasises the merit gained from the recitation, listening, or reading of the given text. It serves to glorify both the hymns as well as the composer of the hymns. Six taniyans precede the Tiruvaymoli, the most of any text in the compendium.

Vāḻi Tirunamam 
Following the customary recitation of the hymns of the work, a vāḻi tirunamam is chanted. This refers to a hymn that serves to commemorate or exalt the poet-saint who composed a given work. For instance, such a verse may hope for the poet-saint to live long, or for their names to be remembered for a millennium.

Compilation
The collection, once thought to have been lost, was organised in the form of an anthology by Nathamuni.

Nathamuni was born in Veera Naarayanapuram (Veeranam) or present-day Kaattu Mannaar Koil. There is a long time gap between Thirumangai Alvar (the last Alvar) and Nathamuni. In this dark period, nobody knew what happened to the 4,000 verses of the text.

Legend has it that once Nathamuni heard some people reciting the cantos of Āravāmude of Nammalvar at Kumbakonam. Captivated by these pasurams (hymns), he wanted to know more about them. One of the verses also mentioned Āyiraththul Ippaththu (Tamil: these 10 out of the 1000). When Nathamuni enquired about the remaining 990, the people who sang the 10 did not know anything about the other verses. But as the song mentioned the name and place of the Alvar (Kurugoor Satakopan), Nathamuni proceeded to Thirukurugoor and asked the people there about Nammalvar's 1,000 verses.

The people did not know the 1,000 verses that Nathamuni wanted, but they told him about 11 pasurams (hymns) of Madhurakavi Alvar, a disciple of Nammalvar, and the Kanninun Cirutampu. They asked him to go to Thiruppulialvar, the place where Nammalvar lived, and recite these 11 pasurams 12,000 times. Nathamuni did as advised, and pleased with his penance, Nammalvar granted him not only his 1,000 pasurams, but the entire 4,000-pasuram collection of all the Alvars.

List of Pasurams

The following table shows the details of the 4,000 pasurams (hymns).

See also 
Tiruvaymoli
Perumal Tirumoli
Periya Tirumoli
Nachiyar Tirumoli
Tiruviruttam

References

External links 

Naalayiram Text in different formats and languages
4000 divya prabandham in Tamil and English - index for downloading full books as well as every ten pasurams individually along with Telugu version for key pasurams. Other key supplementary texts for Divya Prabandham such as Thiruvoi mozhi nootrandhadi, Yethiraja vimsadhi, Mumukshupadi , Guru Paramapara and rare texts, articles, vyakhyanams, discourses available.
4000 Divyaprabhandham pdf in English, Tamil, Sanskrit Kannada, Telugu and Malayalam languages.
Divyaprabandham in Tamil, Telugu, Sanskrit. Thiruvomozhi availabale in convenient 100 song size. Click on downloads/ free downloads
4000 Divya Prabandham In Roman text, pdf formats.
Tamil Virtual University Library.
Download complete 4000 Divya prabandham as a convenient single 2.16 MB pdf file. Only downside is dhanians are not complete.
4000 divya prabandham available as separate files in pdf and unicode formats for every 1000
Entire 4000 and supplementary texts and other mantras as a single epub file in Tamil font
Nalayiram in English/ Roman text. Useful to quote, copy, paste
Prabandham in English Text. Quite useful to cut and paste relevant pasurams.
Divya Prabandham by DivyaDesam - extremely relevant for pilgrims travelling to 108 Divya Desam
Lists pasurams numbers relevant to individual Divya Desam from all Alvar's composition
Nalayiram pasurams in Tamil unicode under four convenient links easy to copy paste
Nalayira Divyaprabandham ANDROID APP with Pasurangal - Divyadesam wise

Nalayiram with Meaning or Vyakyanam (detailed commentary)
Entire 4000 Divya Prabhandam verses with PBA Swamy's meaning in Tamil and Araiyar Swami Sri Rama Bharathi's translation in English. Very useful for reference purposes.
For the first time online - Eedu 36,000 indepth commentary for Thiruvoimozhi at Tamil Virtual University Library
English text , Tamil Document and English meaning for Periya Thiromozhi.
Thiruvoimozhi in Roman text and meaning.
Thiruppavai with meaning.

Nalayiram Pasurangal – Audio
Araiyar Sevai, Listen to pasurams rendered in carnatic music
Mp3 format

Sites Relevant to Nalayiram Divya Prabandham
Articles on Divya Prabandham, Azhvars, Divya Desams and more 
A comprehensive translation of Naalayira (4000) Divya Prabandham
Dictionary of Hindu Lore and Legend by Anna Dallapiccola
Hymns of the Alvars
Best collection of Pictures of Shriman Nathamunigal (who regained the 4000 Divya Prabandham) and Sri Alavandar at their birthplace Chaturvedimangalam also known as Kuppankuzhi.

Tamil Hindu literature
Medieval literature
Alvars